Emre Kılınç (born 23 August 1994) is a Turkish professional footballer who plays as a winger for Ankaragücü.

Professional career
Emre signed for Sivasspor after five successful seasons for Boluspor in the TFF First League. Emre made his professional debut for Sivasspor in a 1–0 Süper Lig loss to Akhisar Belediyespor on 12 August 2017.

Galatasaray
He signed a four-season agreement with Galatasaray on 12 August 2020.

Ankaragücü (loan)
On 8 September 2022, he signed a 1-year loan contract with Süper Lig team Ankaragücü.

International career
Emre debuted for the Turkey national football team in a 1-0 UEFA Euro 2020 qualifying win over Andorra on 7 September 2019.

Career statistics

Club

International

References

External links
 
 
 
 
 
 
 Galatasaray.org Profile

1994 births
Living people
Sportspeople from Adapazarı
Turkish footballers
Turkey international footballers
Turkey youth international footballers
Boluspor footballers
Sivasspor footballers
TFF First League players
Süper Lig players
Association football midfielders
Galatasaray S.K. footballers
MKE Ankaragücü footballers